Red Elm is an unincorporated community in Ziebach County, in the U.S. state of South Dakota.

History
Red Elm had its start in 1910 when the railroad was extended to that point. The community was named for red elm trees near the original town site. A post office called Red Elm was established in 1911, and remained in operation until 1960.

References

Unincorporated communities in Ziebach County, South Dakota
Unincorporated communities in South Dakota